Billy Stewart (born 1 January 1965) is a former professional footballer who played goal, primarily with Chester City. He currently coaches with West Ham United Ladies first team as their Goalkeeping Coach. He joined West Ham United after spending the previous three seasons with Accrington Stanley FC first team and helped them gain promotion to the EFL league 1 as League 2 Champions in the 2017–8 season. He is a current Goalkeeping Coach Educator for the FA and has coached at international level for England and Northern Ireland at the under-21, under-19 and schoolboy levels, and with the Liverpool County FA disability team on a part-time basis. He also coached the Bolton Wanderers Ladies goalkeepers for 2 seasons. He left Liverpool in July 2009 after 10 seasons as a coach, and is a freelance goalkeeping coach. He also played for the England Non League Team in May 1997, against the Scottish Highland Football League at Cove Rangers FC, the Highland Football League Team whose ground is six miles south of Aberdeen. His side won 5–0 that Saturday afternoon in the North of Scotland, with Barry Hayles, Lee Hughes, and Marcus Bignot in the England team, all three players who subsequently went on to play at high levels in the English Football League.

Playing career

Stewart began as an apprentice with his hometown club, Liverpool, with which he turned professional in January 1983. He was unable to make the first team at Anfield and joined Wigan Athletic in July 1984. Stewart made 14 league appearances in two years at Springfield Park before former Latics manager Harry McNally signed him for Chester City in August 1986. After initially sharing goalkeeping duties with John Butcher, Mike Stowell and Mike Astbury, Stewart established himself as a starting goalkeeper. Between January 1988 and October 1990 he did not miss a match; his run of 124 games only ended after a sending-off at Bradford City. In 1992–93 Stewart was named as the club's player of the season (despite conceding more than 100 goals), but a pre-match injury at Scarborough in September 1993 sidelined him for the remainder of the following season. Stewart was allowed to join Northampton Town in July 1994, but ended the season playing at Wembley Stadium for Chesterfield in the Football League Division Three playoff final against Bury (while on loan with the Saltergate club). He helped Chesterfield to a 2–0 victory and promotion, and returned to Chester in the summer of 1995. Stewart missed only one game in 1995–96, but at the end of the season he dropped into gon-league football with Southport. Stewart played for the Sandgrounders for three and a half years, making another trip to Wembley in the final of the 1997–98 FA Trophy (which ended in a 1–0 defeat to Cheltenham Town). Stewart moved to fellow Conference side Hednesford Town in December 1999 and later played for such clubs as Bamber Bridge, Rhyl, Marine and Colwyn Bay.

Coaching career

Stewart has travelled throughout the world and has coached in Texas, USA, for England under-19s in Slovenia for the European Qualifiers, and with the England schoolboys in the Victory Shield. He was also the Northern Ireland goalkeeping coach when the Northern Ireland under-19s retained the Milk Cup. Stewart travelled with Northern Ireland to Portugal for an under-21 friendly game and to Malta with the under-19s. He holds a UEFA A coaching licence and a FA Goalkeeping A licence and the new UEFA Goalkeeping A Licence. Stewart is a recipient of the FA Advanced Youth Award and is an FA Goalkeeping Coach Educator and Internal Verifier. He currently delivers all levels of FA Goalkeeping Level 1 to Level 4 and the FA Level 3 Goalkeeping module for the UEFA B Licence. Billy also holds FA qualifications for Futsal at levels 1&2.

Stewart has worked with every age group at Liverpool. He began at the Academy in 1999 where he was the Academy Goalkeeping Coach, co-ordinating the goalkeeping programme starting with goalkeepers as young as age seven and developing the goalkeeping training programme up to full-time players. Stewart's last full-time role at Liverpool was coaching the reserve-team goalkeepers at the Melwood Training Ground; he also worked with first-team goalkeepers, including Reina, Diego Cavalieri, David Martin and Charles Itandje. He has also worked with other first-line goalkeepers such as Dudek, Kirkland, and Carson. He holds NVQ teaching-assessor and internal-verification certificates, and is fully CRB checked. He joined Accrington Stanley at the start of the 2015/16 season and left after three seasons helping Accrington Stanley gain promotion to the EFL League 1 as League 2 Champions for the 2017/8 season. Billy Stewart is now the full-time first team goalkeeping coach at West Ham United Ladies who are in the Women's Super League.

In November 2020, Stewart was named as temporary co-manager of West Ham United Ladies team following the departure of Matt Beard.

Honours
Chester City
• Player of the Season: 1992–93
• Most appearances by a goalkeeper: 317 

Chesterfield
Football League Division Three playoff winners: 1994–95

Southport
FA Trophy runners-up: 1997–98

Further reading

References

External links

1965 births
Living people
English footballers
Association football goalkeepers
Liverpool F.C. players
Wigan Athletic F.C. players
Chester City F.C. players
Northampton Town F.C. players
Chesterfield F.C. players
Southport F.C. players
Hednesford Town F.C. players
Rhyl F.C. players
Marine F.C. players
Bamber Bridge F.C. players
Colwyn Bay F.C. players
Cymru Premier players
England semi-pro international footballers
Liverpool F.C. non-playing staff
Accrington Stanley F.C. non-playing staff
Footballers from Liverpool
Association football goalkeeping coaches
Women's Super League managers
English football managers